Tymovsky (masculine), Tymovskaya (feminine), or Tymovskoye (neuter) may refer to:
Tymovsky District, a district of Sakhalin Oblast, Russia
Tymovsky Urban Okrug, the municipal formation which it is incorporated as
Tymovskoye, an urban locality (an urban-type settlement) in Sakhalin Oblast, Russia